Second skin may refer to:

Film and TV
Second Skin, a 1994 Star Trek: Deep Space Nine episode
Second Skin, a 1999 Spanish romantic drama film
Second Skin, a 2008 documentary film about Massively Multiplayer Online games (MMOs)

Music
Second Skin, a gothic rock band

Albums 
Second Skin by John Course & mrTimothy
Second Skin by The Mayfield Four

Songs
Second Skin, a 1982 song by The Chameleons on their debut album Script of the Bridge
Second Skin, a 1988 song by Hugo Largo on their debut album Drum
Second Skin, a 1991 song by The Gits
2econd Skin, a 1998 song by Moonspell on the album Sin/Pecado
Second Skin, a 2003 song by VNV Nation

Other users
Second Skin, a 1964 novel by John Hawkes
Second Skin, a 2008 adventure book based on Doctor Who